A Rum Collins is a cocktail based on the Tom Collins substituting a light rum for the gin.

Ingredients
 2oz light rum
 Juice of one lime
 1 teaspoon granulated sugar
 Carbonated water
 Lemon slice
 Cocktail cherry
 Ice cubes

Mixing
Shake the rum, lime juice and sugar and pour into a Collins glass over ice. Fill glass with carbonated water, garnish with lemon and cherry and serve.

Cultural references
James Bond was served a Rum Collins by Largo in the film Thunderball (1965).
Hope Holiday asks for a Rum Collins in the film The Apartment (1960). Katherine March (Joan Bennett) orders one in Scarlet Street (1945). Also in 1945, Bert Pierce (Bruce Bennett) orders two Rum Collins for himself and ex-wife Mildred Pierce (Joan Crawford) in the eponymous movie when he takes her to see their daughter Veda performing at a tropical-themed nightclub. Arthur Peabody (William Powell) orders one in Mr. Peabody and the Mermaid (1948). Inspector Vance (Donald MacBride) orders one in Murder Over New York (1940). Sikorsky (Christopher Lloyd) also orders a Rum Collins in The Dream Team (1989). Carmody is served a Rum Collins by the omnipotent Melichrone in the novel Dimension of Miracles (1968).

References

Cocktails with rum